Zhao Zhiwen (born 27 November 1983 in Nantong) is an Olympic equestrian sportsman for China. His best performance is winning gold at the 2005 National Games - team jumping event. He will compete at the 2008 Summer Olympics in Beijing in the show jumping events.

External links
http://www.olympedia.org/athletes/116745

1983 births
Living people
Equestrians at the 2008 Summer Olympics
Olympic equestrians of China
Chinese male equestrians
Sportspeople from Nantong
Show jumping riders